Edwin Farnham Butler III (born April 14, 1980) is an American-Canadian singer, songwriter, musician, and multi-instrumentalist. He co-founded the Montreal-based indie rock band Arcade Fire with Josh Deu and his wife Régine Chassagne.

Early life
Butler was born in Truckee, California, and raised in The Woodlands, Texas, with a Mormon upbringing. He lived in Buenos Aires, Argentina, before his brother Will was born.

His father, Edwin Farnham Butler II, worked as a geologist for oil conglomerate Halliburton in Houston, Texas. His mother, Liza Rey, who performed on the family TV show, The King Family Show, plays jazz harp and sings. Butler's parents currently live on Mount Desert Island, Maine. Butler's maternal grandfather was jazz steel guitarist Alvino Rey, a pioneer bandleader whose career spanned eight decades. His maternal grandmother, Luise, was a member of The King Sisters, who starred in a weekly variety program on ABC called The King Family Show.

At the age of 15, Butler started attending the Phillips Exeter Academy preparatory school in New Hampshire, where he lived in Abbot Hall. After graduation, he studied photography and creative writing at Sarah Lawrence College, but left after a year.

Career
Butler moved to Montreal, Quebec, Canada in 2000 to attend McGill University, where he met his future wife, Régine Chassagne, whom he married in 2003. Butler graduated from McGill in 2004 with a bachelor's degree in religious studies.

Butler participated in the 2005 UNICEF benefit project, "Do They Know It's Hallowe'en?," along with Chassagne. The two also collaborated on the music for the Richard Kelly film The Box.

On April 2, 2011, LCD Soundsystem played its last concert before its disbandment. Arcade Fire performed with them during the song "North American Scum." During James Murphy's stumbling introduction to the song, Butler shouted out "shut up and play the hits!" Murphy immediately responded, "ladies and gentlemen, for our live record entitled 'Shut Up and Play the Hits'" and Butler's cry later became the title of the documentary of the concert.
In September 2011, Butler played in a charity basketball tournament in Toronto, Ontario, known as "Rock The Court." Several other celebrities and athletes participated, such as Matt Bonner of the San Antonio Spurs.

Butler also works as a DJ using the stage name Windows 98. Sometimes he works under this moniker as the opening act for Arcade Fire itself.

In March 2015, Butler and Chassagne attended the launch of music streaming service Tidal, and revealed themselves, along with other notable artists, as shareholders in the company.

Personal life
Butler is married to fellow Arcade Fire member Régine Chassagne, who gave birth to the couple's only child, a son, in 2013.

Butler lives in New Orleans with his family. 

Butler was naturalized as a Canadian citizen on July 9, 2019, in a ceremony held in Montreal and hosted by Immigration, Refugees and Citizenship Canada minister Ahmed Hussen.

Butler is a frequent participant in the NBA All-Star Celebrity Game, and won the game's Most Valuable Player award in 2016.

Sexual misconduct allegations 
According to a Pitchfork article published on August 27, 2022, four individuals have accused Butler of sexual misconduct, with some saying he initially contacted them on social media. Butler said all contact with the accusers was consensual, and he denies all allegations of misconduct. In a statement to Pitchfork, a representative for Butler acknowledged he had sexual interactions with each of them, but said they were not initiated by him and were consensual. His wife corroborated his statements.

On November 22, 2022, Pitchfork published a follow-up article detailing Butler's manipulative interactions towards a fifth person. These interactions were described by the individual as "Emotionally abusive, manipulative, toxic, and using his power dynamic to exploit my body at times that were convenient for him."

References

1980 births
Alternative rock guitarists
American rock singers
Singer-songwriters from California
Canadian rock singers
Arcade Fire members
Living people
McGill University alumni
Musicians from Houston
Phillips Exeter Academy alumni
Sarah Lawrence College alumni
American indie rock musicians
Canadian indie rock musicians
Grammy Award winners
People from Truckee, California
People from The Woodlands, Texas
Former Latter Day Saints
Guitarists from Texas
21st-century American guitarists
21st-century American singers
21st-century American pianists
21st-century American keyboardists
American mandolinists
21st-century American bass guitarists
American banjoists
American male singer-songwriters
21st-century Canadian guitarists
21st-century Canadian male singers
21st-century Canadian pianists
21st-century Canadian keyboardists
Canadian mandolinists
21st-century Canadian bass guitarists
Canadian banjoists
Canadian male singer-songwriters
American male pianists
American male bass guitarists
Singer-songwriters from Texas